Bethesda is a township in Saint Paul Parish on the island of Antigua, in Antigua and Barbuda.

It is located in the southeastern area of the island, to the northeast of English Harbour, at the head of Willoughby Bay.

Geography 
Bethesda may be found on Willoughby Bay, which is a wide bay on the east coast of the island's southern peninsula. The terrain flattens out and extends inland to the northeast, eventually reaching the Central Plain, which is the island's core plain. The hills of Monks Hill may be found to the southwest, and they border both Falmouth Bay and English Harbour. The region is primarily agricultural and has a low population density. 

The settlement, which has a population of exactly 499 people in 2011, may be found along the route that leads from St. Phillip's Parish in the southeastern part of Antigua to English Harbour. 

The Bethesda Dam is located in the interior and is the second largest dam in the United States, behind the Potworks Dam, which is located around 2 kilometers to the north. One of the largest remaining mangrove stands on the island is located at the Christian Cove wetland, which is located on the shore.

History 
The Methodists, who first arrived in Antigua in 1760 and began spreading their religion throughout the island, established a school for the employees of the Blake estate in 1812. It was the very first school in the West Indies to be constructed specifically for enslaved people. The pastoral care center saw an increase in patients following the abolition of slavery in 1834, which led to the establishment of a new location. In the beginning, the congregation and chapel were situated in Bridgetown, which is located on Willoughby Bay. In the year 1841, the mission relocated to Bethesda, which gets its name from the new church in recognition of the Bethesda Garden. Willoughby Bay was a hamlet in Antigua that was abandoned in 1843 after an earthquake. The people who lived there migrated to Freetown, which was at the time the most prominent freed-village on the island of Antigua. Some of them also moved to Bethesda. Even as early as 1847, the church underwent expansion, and in 1871, a new church that also included a school was constructed. The Methodists ran the classes until 1962, when a state school was founded. The current church building, which is a sturdy structure "dedicated to the glory of God," was constructed in 1975.

In addition, Bethesda was a significant player in the development of the early labor movement throughout history. In this location in January of 1951, the workers of the sugar cane industry engaged in a labor dispute with a major landowner named Alexander Moody-Stuart over their wages. Vere Cornwall Bird, who had previously served as the first prime minister of the independent state of Antigua and Barbuda, delivered the speech from which the winged term "to eat mussels and Widdy-Widdy and drink pond water" originates. In the event that there was nothing to eat as a result of the strike, we would sip pond water. At the time of the slaves, there was often excess bread lying around the Bethesda area, and anyone could take it. It has been exactly one year since the workers went on strike and successfully pushed for greater wages. In the shade of the unassuming Tamarind tree, which still stands today but is significant in the annals of the nation's history, the terms were initially developed.

Nowadays, the location is home to a medical facility, an elementary school, and congregations of the Methodist Church in the Caribbean and Americas, the Church of God Antigua (Bethesda Zion Church, which was established in 1951), and the St. John's Pentecostal Church (1950s).

Enumeration Districts 

 71400 Bethesda-East
 71500 Bethesda-West
Bethesda-East has a population of 291, and is 97.45% Afro-Antiguan, and 0.89 square kilometres. Bethesda-East shares boundaries with Saint Philip Parish. Bethesda-West has a population of 208, and is 94.90% Afro-Antiguan, and 0.73 square kilometres.

Demographics

Census Data (2011) 
Source:

References
Scott, C. R. (ed.) (2005) Insight guide: Caribbean (5th edition). London: Apa Publications.

Populated places in Antigua and Barbuda
Saint Paul Parish, Antigua and Barbuda